Danny Lebern Glover (born July 22, 1946) is an American actor, film director, and political activist. He is widely known for his lead role as Roger Murtaugh in the Lethal Weapon film series. He also had leading roles in his films included The Color Purple, To Sleep with Anger, Predator 2, Angels in the Outfield, and Operation Dumbo Drop.

Glover has prominent supporting roles in Silverado, Witness, A Rage in Harlem, Dreamgirls, Shooter, Death at a Funeral, Beyond the Lights, Saw, Sorry to Bother You, The Last Black Man in San Francisco, The Dead Don't Die, Lonesome Dove and Jumanji: The Next Level. He is also an active supporter of various political causes.

He has received numerous accolades, including the Jean Hersholt Humanitarian Award from the Academy of Motion Picture Arts and Sciences, the NAACP's President's Award and the Cuban National Medal of Friendship by the Cuban Council of State. In addition, he has also received nominations for four Primetime Emmy Awards, four Grammy Awards, and a Daytime Emmy Award. In 2023, he was inducted into the Black Music & Entertainment Walk of Fame. IndieWire named him one of the best actors never to have received an Academy Award nomination.

Early life
Danny Lebern Glover was born in San Francisco, California, the son of Carrie (Hunley) and James Glover. Both of his parents were postal workers, and were active in the National Association for the Advancement of Colored People (NAACP), working to advance equal rights. Glover's mother, daughter of a midwife, was born in Louisville, Georgia and graduated from Paine College in Augusta, Georgia. His father was a World War II veteran. He graduated from George Washington High School in San Francisco.

As an adolescent and a young adult, Glover had epilepsy but has not had a seizure since age 35. He attended San Francisco State University (SFSU) in the late 1960s but did not graduate. SFSU later awarded him the Presidential Medal of San Francisco State University for his service to education. Glover trained at the Black Actors' Workshop of the American Conservatory Theater.

Career

Glover originally worked in city administration working on community development before transitioning to theater. He has said:

I didn't think it was a difficult transition. Acting is a platform that can become a conveyer for ideas. Art is a way of understanding, of confronting issues and confronting your own feelings—all within that realm of the capacity it represents. It may have been a leap of faith for me, given not only my learning disability (dyslexia) but also the fact that I felt awkward. I felt all the things that someone that's 6′3" or 6′4" feels and with my own diminished expectations of who I could be [and] would feel. Whether it's art, acting or theater that I've devoted myself to I put more passion and more energy into it.

His first theater involvement was with the American Conservatory Theater, a regional training program in San Francisco. Glover also trained with Jean Shelton at the Shelton Actors Lab in San Francisco. In an interview on Inside the Actors Studio, Glover credited Jean Shelton for much of his development as an actor. Deciding that he wanted to be an actor, Glover resigned from his city administration job and soon began his career as a stage actor. Glover then moved to Los Angeles for more opportunities in acting, where he would later go on to co-found the Robey Theatre Company with actor Ben Guillory in honor of the actor and concert singer Paul Robeson in Los Angeles in 1994.

Glover has had a variety of film, stage, and television roles, and is best known for playing Los Angeles police Sergeant Roger Murtaugh in the Lethal Weapon series of action films, starring alongside Mel Gibson, and Joe Pesci. Later he once again starred with Gary Busey in the blockbuster Predator 2. He also starred as the husband to Whoopi Goldberg's character Celie in the celebrated literary adaptation The Color Purple, and as Lieutenant James McFee in the film Witness. In 1994 he made his directorial debut with the Showtime channel short film Override.

Also in 1994, Glover and actor Ben Guillory founded the Robey Theatre Company in Los Angeles, focusing on theatre by and about black people. During his career, he has made several cameos, appearing, for example, in the Michael Jackson video "Liberian Girl" of 1987. Glover earned top billing for the first time in Predator 2, the sequel to the science fiction action film Predator. That same year he starred in Charles Burnett's To Sleep with Anger, for which he won the Independent Spirit Award for Best Male Lead.

In common with Humphrey Bogart, Elliott Gould, and Robert Mitchum, who have played Raymond Chandler's private eye detective Philip Marlowe, Glover played the role in the episode "Red Wind" of the Showtime network's 1995 series Fallen Angels. In 1997, under his former production company banner Carrie Films, Glover executive produced numerous films of first time directors including Pamm Malveaux's neo-noir short film Final Act starring Joe Morton, which aired on the Independent Film Channel. In addition, Glover has been a voice actor in many children's movies. Glover was featured in the popular 2001 film The Royal Tenenbaums, also starring Gwyneth Paltrow, Anjelica Huston, Ben Stiller, and Owen Wilson.

In 2004, he appeared in the low-budget horror film Saw as Detective David Tapp. In 2005, Glover and Joslyn Barnes announced plans to make No FEAR, a film about Dr. Marsha Coleman-Adebayo's experience. Coleman-Adebayo won a 2000 jury trial against the US Environmental Protection Agency (EPA). The jury found the EPA guilty of violating the civil rights of Coleman-Adebayo on the basis of race, sex, color, and a hostile work environment, under the Civil Rights Act of 1964. Coleman-Adebayo was terminated shortly after she revealed the environmental and human disaster taking place in the Brits, South Africa, vanadium mines. Her experience inspired the passage of the Notification and Federal Employee Anti-discrimination and Retaliation Act of 2002 (No-FEAR Act).  the No Fear title has not appeared but The Marsha Coleman-Adebayo Story was announced as the next major project of No Fear Media Productions.

Glover portrayed David Keaton in the film The Exonerated—a real-life story of Keaton's experience of being arrested, jailed, and then freed from death row.

In 2009, Glover performed in The People Speak, a documentary feature film that uses dramatic and musical performances of the letters, diaries, and speeches of everyday Americans, based on historian Howard Zinn's A People's History of the United States.

Glover played President Wilson, the President of the United States in 2012, a disaster film directed by Roland Emmerich and released in theaters November 13, 2009. In 2010, Glover participated in a Spanish film called I Want to Be a Soldier. In 2012, he starred in the film Donovan's Echo.

Glover co-starred in the science fiction comedy film Sorry to Bother You, which was released in theaters on July 6, 2018.

Planned directorial debut

Glover sought to make a film biography of Toussaint Louverture for his directorial debut. In May 2006, the film had included cast members Wesley Snipes, Angela Bassett, Don Cheadle, Jonathan Rhys Meyers, Chiwetel Ejiofor, Roger Guenveur Smith, Mos Def, Isaach de Bankolé, and Richard Bohringer. Production, estimated to cost $30 million, was planned to begin in Poland, filming from late 2006 into early 2007. 

In May 2007, President of Venezuela Hugo Chávez contributed $18 million to fund the production of Toussaint for Glover, who was a prominent U.S. supporter of Chávez. The contribution annoyed some Venezuelan filmmakers, who said the money could have funded other homegrown films and that Glover's film was not even about Venezuela. 

In April 2008, the Venezuelan National Assembly authorized an additional $9,840,505 for Glover's film, which is still in planning. 

In 2015, Glover gave an update on the Toussaint project, stating, "The film that we always missed is a movie on the Haitian revolution and Toussaint Louverture. The company is fortuitously named after him and that was the movie that I wanted to do. We’ve developed a script. We thought we were going to get it done four years ago. We thought we were going to be making it right now. But also there are other kinds of things that intrigue me."

Public appearances
Glover appeared at London Film and Comic Con 2013 at Earls Court 2 over 2.5 days during Friday 5th to Sunday, July 7. He participated in a panel discussion in McComb, Mississippi on July 16, 2015. The event, co-sponsored by The Gloster Project and Jubilee Performing Arts Center, included noted authors Terry McMillan and Quincy Troupe.

On January 30, 2015, Glover was the Keynote Speaker and 2015 Honoree for the MLK Celebration Series at the Rhode Island School of Design (Providence, RI). Glover used his career and personal story to speak on the topic "Creativity and Democracy: Social Change through the Arts". At the University of the Virgin Islands, Glover gave a speech that encouraged the graduates in their upcoming journey.

It was announced in July 2018 that Glover will be the featured guest at the Port Townsend Film Festival in Washington State.

Personal life
Glover married Asake Bomani in 1975 and they have a daughter, Mandisa, born in 1976. Glover and Bomani divorced in 2000. Glover married Eliane Cavalleiro in 2009. They divorced in 2022.

Glover purchased a  house in Dunthorpe, Oregon, in 1999. As of 2011, he no longer lives in Oregon.

On April 16, 2010, Glover was arrested in Maryland during a protest by SEIU workers for Sodexo's alleged unfair and illegal treatment of workers. He was given a citation and later released. The Associated Press reports "Glover and others stepped past yellow police tape and were asked to step back three times at Sodexo headquarters. When they refused, officers arrested them."

Activism

Civil rights activism

While attending San Francisco State University (SFSU), Glover was a member of the Black Students' Union, which, along with the Third World Liberation Front and the American Federation of Teachers, collaborated in a five-month student-led strike to establish a Department of Black Studies. The strike was the longest student walkout in U.S. history. It helped create not only the first Department of Black Studies but also the first School of Ethnic Studies in the United States.

Hari Dillon, current president of the Vanguard Public Foundation, was a fellow striker at SFSU. Glover later co-chaired Vanguard's board. He is also a board member of the Algebra Project, the Black AIDS Institute, Walden House and Cheryl Byron's Something Positive Dance Group. He was charged with disorderly conduct and unlawful assembly after being arrested outside the Sudanese Embassy in Washington during a protest over Sudan's humanitarian crisis in Darfur.

In 1999, he used his leverage as a former San Francisco cab driver to raise awareness about African Americans being passed over for white passengers. In response, Rudolph Giuliani launched Operation Refusal, which suspended the licenses of cab drivers who favored white passengers over black ones.

Glover's long history of union activism includes support for the United Farm Workers, UNITE HERE, and numerous service unions. In March 2010, Glover supported 375 Union workers in Ohio by calling upon all actors at the 2010 Academy Awards to boycott Hugo Boss suits following announcement of Hugo Boss's decision to close a manufacturing plant in Ohio after a proposed pay decrease from $13 to $8.30 an hour was rejected by the Workers United Union.

On November 1, 2011, Glover spoke to the crowd at Occupy Oakland on the day before the Oakland General Strike where thousands of protestors shut down the Port of Oakland.

Political activism
Glover was an early supporter of former North Carolina Senator John Edwards in the 2008 Democratic presidential primaries until Edwards' withdrawal, although some news reports indicated that he had endorsed Ohio Congressman Dennis Kucinich, whom he had endorsed in 2004. After Edwards dropped out, Glover then endorsed Barack Obama. In February 2016, Glover endorsed Vermont Senator Bernie Sanders for the Democratic presidential nomination. In February 2019, Glover again endorsed Sanders for US president in 2020.

In 2017, he co-authored a petition along with Noam Chomsky, Mark Ruffalo, Nancy Fraser, Oliver Stone and Eve Ensler, urging French citizens to vote for candidate Jean-Luc Mélenchon in the 2017 presidential election.

Glover was an outspoken critic of George W. Bush, calling him a known racist. "Yes, he's racist. We all knew that. As Texas's governor, Bush led a penitentiary system that executed more people than all the other U.S. states together. And most of the people who died were Afro-Americans or Hispanics."

Glover's support of California Proposition 7 (2008) led him to use his voice in an automated phone call to generate support for the measure before the election.

On the foreign policy of the Obama administration, Glover said: "I think the Obama administration has followed the same playbook, to a large extent, almost verbatim, as the Bush administration. I don't see anything different... On the domestic side, look here: What's so clear is that this country from the outset is projecting the interests of wealth and property. Look at the bailout of Wall Street. Why not the bailout of Main Street? He may be just a different face, and that face may happen to be black, and if it were Hillary Clinton, it would happen to be a woman.... But what choices do they have within the structure?"

Glover wrote the foreword to Phyllis Bennis' book, Challenging Empire: How People, Governments, and the UN Defy US Power. Glover is also a member of the board of directors of the Center for Economic and Policy Research, a think tank led by economist Dean Baker.

International

Africa
Glover is an active board member of the TransAfrica Forum. On April 6, 2009, Glover was given a chieftaincy title in Imo State, Nigeria. His title, "Enyioma of Nkwerre", means A Good Friend in the language of the Igbo people of Eastern Nigeria.

Brazil
In 2018, Glover, as the UN Goodwill Ambassador, met with Lula to express solidarity and support for his presidential candidacy. During a trip to Brazil, he also met with the family of Marielle Franco, the City Council member and LGBT activist murdered in Rio de Janeiro.

Caribbean and Haiti
On January 13, 2010, Glover compared the scale and devastation of the 2010 Haiti earthquake to the predicament other island nations may face as a result of the failed Copenhagen summit the previous year. Glover said: "the threat of what happens to Haiti is a threat that can happen anywhere in the Caribbean to these island nations ... they're all in peril because of global warming ... because of climate change ... when we did what we did at the climate summit in Copenhagen, this is the response, this is what happens". In the same statement, he called for a new form of international partnership with Haiti and other Caribbean nations and praised Venezuela, Brazil, and Cuba, for already accepting this partnership.

Iraq War
Danny Glover had been an outspoken critic of the Iraq War before the war began in March 2003. In February 2003, he was one of the featured speakers at Justin Herman Plaza in San Francisco where other notable speakers included names such as author Alice Walker, singer Joan Baez, United Farm Workers co-founder Dolores Huerta and Rep. Barbara Lee, D-Oakland.
Glover was a signatory to the April 2003 anti-war letter "To the Conscience of the World" that criticized the unilateral American invasion of Iraq that led to "massive loss of civilian life" and "devastation of one of the cultural patrimonies of humanity".
During an anti-war demonstration in Downtown Oakland in March 2003, Glover praised the community leaders for their anti-war efforts saying that "They're on the front lines because they are trying to make a better America. ... The world has come together and said 'no' to this war – and we must stand with them."

Venezuela
In January 2006, Harry Belafonte led a delegation of activists, including Glover, activist/professor Cornel West, and  activist/Santa Cruz Barrios Unidos Founder and Executive Director Daniel NANE Alejandrez in a meeting with President of Venezuela Hugo Chávez. In 2006, Glover had begun working on a film about Toussaint Louverture, who led the 18th century revolt in Haiti and, it was reported, that Chavez supported the film, "hoping the historical epic will sprinkle Hollywood stardust on his effort to mobilise world public opinion against imperialism and western oppression." In 2007, Glover agreed with Venezuelan President Hugo Chávez that the Touissant Louverture film would be financed by Venezuela. On May 19, 2007, the National Assembly of Venezuela approved giving Glover $18,000,000 for the film. The following year, on April 9, 2008, the National Assembly of Venezuela, at the request of the Chávez, approved another $9,000,000 to be handed to Glover in order to "continue" the filming of the film about Touissant. Surprisingly, in an interview dated January 5, 2015, published in Filmmaker magazine, Glover says, "The film that we always missed is a movie on the Haitian revolution and Toussaint Louverture. The company is fortuitously named after him and that was the movie that I wanted to do. We’ve developed a script. We thought we were going to get it done four years ago. We thought we were going to be making it right now. But also there are other kinds of things that intrigue me". , the film had not been made.

Glover was also a board member of TeleSUR, a media network primarily funded by the Venezuelan government. During the beginning of the 2014 Venezuela Protests, Glover shared his support to Chávez's successor, President Nicolás Maduro, calling members of his government "the stewards" of Venezuela's democracy. Glover also told Venezuelan government supporters to go fight for the sovereignty of Maduro's government. Through the crisis in Bolivarian Venezuela, Glover continued to show his support for the Bolivarian government and President Maduro's administration.

Israel
On September 2, 2009, Glover signed an open letter of objection to the inclusion of a series of films intended to showcase Tel Aviv—without the participation of Palestinian filmmakers, at the Toronto International Film Festival.

Music
Glover has become an active member of board of directors of The Jazz Foundation of America. He became involved with The Jazz Foundation in 2005, and has been a featured host for their annual benefit A Great Night in Harlem for several years, as well appearing as a celebrity MC at other events for the foundation. In 2006, Britain's leading African theatre company Tiata Fahodzi appointed Glover as one of its three Patrons, joining Chiwetel Ejiofor and Jocelyn Jee Esien opening the organization's tenth-anniversary celebrations (February 2, 2008) at the Theatre Royal Stratford East, London.

Filmography

Awards and honours 

In 2010, Glover delivered the Commencement Address and was awarded an honorary Doctor of Humane Letters degree from Utah State University. The same year, Starr King School for the Ministry awarded him a Doctorate of Humane Letters in absentia. He was awarded the doctorate specifically for his long history of activism, including support for the United Farm Workers, UNITE HERE, The Algebra Project, The Black AIDS Institute, as well as his humanitarian efforts on behalf of the Haiti earthquake victims, literacy and civil rights and his fight against unjust labor practices.

He was also the recipient of a tribute paid by the Deauville American Film Festival in France on September 7, 2011.

Glover was awarded the Cuban National Medal of Friendship by the Cuban Council of State on December 29, 2016, in a ceremony in Havana for his solidarity with the Cuban 5 during their time of incarceration in the United States.

On March 25, 2022, the Academy of Motion Picture Arts and Sciences (AMPAS) presented Glover with the Jean Hersholt Humanitarian Award at the Governors Awards ceremony.

In 2023, he was inducted into the Black Music & Entertainment Walk of Fame in Atlanta, Georgia.

See also
List of peace activists

References

External links

 
 
 
 

1946 births
Living people
20th-century American male actors
21st-century American male actors
Activists from California
African-American activists
African-American film directors
African-American film producers
African-American male actors
African-American television producers
American anti-war activists
American civil rights activists
American Conservatory Theater alumni
American film producers
American humanitarians
American male film actors
American male television actors
American male video game actors
American male voice actors
American political activists
American socialists
Audiobook narrators
Center for Economic and Policy Research
City College of San Francisco alumni
Film directors from San Francisco
Film producers from California
Independent Spirit Award for Best Male Lead winners
Jean Hersholt Humanitarian Award winners
Male actors from California
Male actors from Oregon
Male actors from San Francisco
People from Dunthorpe, Oregon
Actors with dyslexia
People with epilepsy
San Francisco State University alumni
Television producers from California
Television producers from Oregon